Victória Kristine Albuquerque de Miranda (born 14 March 1998), simply known as Victória, is a Brazilian professional footballer who plays as a midfielder for Corinthians and the Brazil women's national team.

International career
Victória represented Brazil at the 2018 South American U-20 Women's Championship and two FIFA U-20 Women's World Cup editions (2016 and 2018). She made her senior debut in 2019.

International goals
Scores and results list Brazil's goal tally first

Honours

Club
Corinthians
Copa Libertadores Femenina: 2019
Campeonato Paulista feminino 2019

Individual
Outstanding New Player of the Campeonato Brasileiro 2019
Best Midfielder of the Campeonato Brasileiro 2019

References

External links

1998 births
Living people
Women's association football midfielders
Women's association football forwards
Brazilian women's footballers
Footballers from Brasília
Brazil women's international footballers
Grêmio Osasco Audax Esporte Clube players
Sport Club Corinthians Paulista (women) players